Ari Koponen (born 5 May 1982 in Vantaa) is a Finnish politician currently serving in the Parliament of Finland for the Finns Party at the Uusimaa constituency.

References

1982 births
Living people
People from Vantaa
Finns Party politicians
Members of the Parliament of Finland (2019–23)